Sir Robert Alexander Ferguson, 2nd Baronet (26 December 1795 –13 March 1860) was a Whig and then Liberal Party politician from Ireland.

Ferguson was born in Derry in 1796 as son of Sir Andrew Ferguson (1761–1808), a banker and mayor of Derry from 1796 to 1798, and Elizabeth, daughter of the Derry merchant Robert Alexander of Broom Hall, who was the brother of James Alexander, 1st Earl of Caledon. Ferguson succeeded to the baronetcy in July 1808, after his father was killed in accident on a bridge in Moville, County Donegal. Ferguson was educated at Trinity College, Cambridge, where he graduated MA in 1817.  He was colonel of the County Militia and Lord Lieutenant of County Londonderry from 1840 to 1860. He lived at The Farm, County Londonderry.

He was appointed High Sheriff of Donegal in 1818 and High Sheriff of Tyrone in 1825 and then elected as the Member of Parliament (MP) for Londonderry City at the 1830 general election, but his election was declared void. A member of the United University club, he was re-elected at the resulting by-election held on 2 April 1831, and held the seat until his death in 1860, at the age of 63, when the baronetcy became extinct. In 1859 he voted in favour of the Derby ministry's reform bill.

There is a statue of Ferguson in Brooke Park in his native Derry.

References

External links 

1795 births
1860 deaths
Whig (British political party) MPs for Irish constituencies
Irish Liberal Party MPs
Members of the Parliament of the United Kingdom for County Londonderry constituencies (1801–1922)
UK MPs 1830–1831
UK MPs 1831–1832
UK MPs 1832–1835
UK MPs 1835–1837
UK MPs 1837–1841
UK MPs 1841–1847
UK MPs 1847–1852
UK MPs 1852–1857
UK MPs 1857–1859
UK MPs 1859–1865
Alumni of Trinity College, Cambridge
Baronets in the Baronetage of the United Kingdom
Lord-Lieutenants of County Londonderry
High Sheriffs of Tyrone
High Sheriffs of Donegal